Idris I was a grandson of Mai Bir kachim and a descendant of Ibrahim Nikale. He established peaceful relationship with the Sao after four Kanem kings had been killed during conflicts with the Bornu indigenous ethnic groups or Sao.  Idris I was a member of the Sayfawa dynasty.

Rulers of the Kanem Empire